Adesmia adrianii is an endemic perennial shrub found in Argentina.

References

Flora of Argentina
adrianii